Salsipuedes may refer to:

Salsipuedes: a Tale of Love, War and Anchovies, a 2004 opera by Daniel Catán
Salsipuedes (film), a 2016 Panamanian film directed by Ricardo Aguilar Navarro
Salsipuedes Massacre, an 1831 killing in Uruguay
Isla Salsipuedes, an island in the Gulf of California

See also 
 Salsipuedes Creek (disambiguation)